Temploux is a village of Wallonia and a district of the city of Namur, located in the province of Namur, Belgium.

External links

Sub-municipalities of Namur (city)
Former municipalities of Namur (province)